Buruma may refer to:
 Buruma, Japanese for bloomers, specifically athletic bloomers
 , a character in the Japanese comic series Dragon Ball, by Akira Toriyama
 Ian Buruma, pen-name of an author on Japanese culture
 Buruma (Baucau), a village in  East Timor in the district of Baucau